The Space Science Institute (SSI) in Boulder, Colorado, is a nonprofit, public-benefit corporation formed in 1992.  Its purpose is to create and maintain an environment where scientific research and education programs can flourish in an integrated fashion. SSI is among the four non-profit institutes in the US cited in a 2007 report by Nature, including Southwest Research Institute, Planetary Science Institute, and Eureka Scientific, which manage federal grants for non-tenure-track astronomers.

Description 

SSI's research program encompasses the following areas: space physics, earth science, planetary science, and astrophysics.  The flight operations branch manages the Cassini-Huygens spacecraft's visible camera instrument and provides spectacular images of Saturn and its moons and rings to the public. SSI participates in mission operations and is home to the Cassini Imaging Central Laboratory for OPerations (CICLOPS).

The primary goal of SSI is to bring together researchers and educators to improve science education.  Toward this end, the institute acts as an umbrella for researchers who wish to be independent of universities.  In addition, it works with educators directly to improve teaching methods for astronomy.  SSI has also produced several traveling exhibits for science museums, including Electric Space, Mars Quest, and Alien Earths. It is currently producing Giant Worlds.

SSI provides management support for research scientists and principal investigators, which help them to submit proposals to major public funding agencies such as National Aeronautics and Space Administration (NASA), National Science Foundation (NSF), Space Telescope Science Institute (STSci), Department of Energy (DOE), and Jet Propulsion Laboratory (JPL) Principal investigators are supported by SSI though proposal budget preparation, proposal submission, and  project reporting tools, and have competitive negotiated overhead rates.

The institute is loosely affiliated with the University of Colorado Boulder. SSI has obtained several grants in astrophysical sciences since 1992 from NSF and NASA funding agencies.

Divisions 

SSI has five research centers:
 Center for Space Plasma Physics (CSPP),
 Center for Extrasolar Planetary Systems (CEPS),
 Center for Mars Science (CMS),
 Center for Polarimetric Remote Sensing (CPRS),
 Center for Data Science (CDS).

SSI's National Center for Interactive Learning (NCIL) is dedicated to expanding the understanding of educators, and citizens in science through educational and outreach programs by SSI researchers in four interconnected groups: Exhibition Development, Digital Learning, rofessional Development, and Public Engagement.

SSI is managed by a board of 12 directors for Aerospace, Academic Research, Small Business Consultant, Astronomy, Science and Technology, Engineering, Civil Space, Martin, Planetarium,  Innovation, Legal and Policy, and 4 acting directors for Research, National Center for Interactive Learning (NCIL), Information Systems and Technology (IST), and Business Operations.

Gallery 

SSI has participated in NASA's Cassini mission and hosted the Cassini Imaging Central Laboratory for OPerations (CICLOPS).

See also
 Heidi Hammel
 Carolyn Porco
 Associated Universities, Inc.
 Planetary Science Institute
 Space Studies Institute
 Southwest Research Institute

References

External links
 
 National Center for Interactive Learning
 Scientific Publications (INSPIRE-HEP)
 Scientific Publications (ResearchGate)

Non-profit organizations based in the United States
Organizations established in 1992
Research institutes established in 1992
Companies based in Boulder, Colorado
Astronomy institutes and departments
Astrophysics institutes
Research institutes in Colorado
1992 establishments in Colorado
Space organizations